Kaluwas is a village in Rewari mandal of Rewari district, in the Indian state of Haryana.

Demographics
As of 2011 India census, Kaluwas had a population of 1511 in 301 households. Males (778) constitute 51.48%  of the population and females (733) 48.51%. Kaluwas has an average literacy (1144) rate of 75.71%, more than the national average of 74%: male literacy (659) is 57.60%, and female literacy (485) is 42.39%. In Kaluwas, 11.71% of the population is under 6 years of age (177).

Adjacent villages
Kharagwas
Chandawas
Saharanwas
Budhpur

References

Villages in Rewari district